The canton of Saint-Malo-Nord is a former canton of France, located in the arrondissement of Saint-Malo, in the Ille-et-Vilaine département, Brittany région. It had 25,703 inhabitants (2012). It was disbanded following the French canton reorganisation which came into effect in March 2015. The canton comprised part of the commune of Saint-Malo.

Election results

The canton of Saint-Malo-Nord is represented in the general council of Ille-et-Vilaine department by the DVD councillor Catherine Jacquemin.

2008

References

Saint-Malo-Nord
2015 disestablishments in France
States and territories disestablished in 2015